"Open Up" is a song recorded by British electronic duo Leftfield featuring John Lydon (of Sex Pistols and Public Image Ltd.). It was released as a single on 1 November 1993. The single reached number 13 on the UK Singles Chart, number one on the UK Dance Singles Chart and number 39 in both Australia and New Zealand. NME reported in their 18 September 1993 issue, "This is the record that people have always wanted Lydon to do." In 2014, the same publication ranked "Open Up" at number 444 on their list of the "500 Greatest Songs of All Time".

"The Dust Brothers Remix" is an early remix by the Chemical Brothers, before they were forced to change to their current name. On later compilations, the remix appears as "The Chemical Brothers Remix" and is over nine minutes in duration (compared to eight minutes as first released). The longer version adds more than a minute of extra material around the 6–7-minute mark. The "I Hate Pink Floyd Mix" and the "Open Dub" were remixed by The Sabres of Paradise. The other 1993 versions are by Leftfield themselves.

The song made an appearance on the soundtracks to Hackers and Rogue Trader, and it is also the title track to the Acclaim baseball video game All-Star Baseball 2000.

Critical reception
Caroline Sullivan from The Guardian wrote that Leftfield and Lydon "has produced a surprisingly excellent one-off single. Lydon is in finest misanthropic form, the subject of his ire his adopted home, Hollywood. He has discovered a lower register to offset his nasal bark; this, and LeftField's clattering technomatic beat make him sound positively sinister." James Masterton described it as "a rather brilliant piece of dance with Lydon's customary snarling vocals adding to the effect quite brilliantly and giving him a bigger hit than PIL have managed since Rise made No.11 in 1986." Pan-European magazine Music & Media commented, "It's surprising to hear what Johnny Rotten can do to a '90s dance track, and impressive too. His classic voice works a thread of hysteria through a basically pumped track from Leftfield. A dark piece, well worth checking." 

Andy Beevers from Music Week rated it four out of five. He added, "The end result actually lives up to the hype, with Lydon's revitalised ranting carried along by a thumping trance production. It is certain to be a big specialist seller, and it could cross over if the tiny Hard Hands label plays its cards right." Brad Beatnik from the RM Dance Update stated that "this really is a remarkable record. The combination of Leftfield's deep, dubby rhythms and John Lydon's unique crazed vocals is awesome. Imagine the pummelling insistency of 'Rez' combined with a near psychotic frenzied vocal and you'll be somewhere near the majesty of this track." Another editor, James Hamilton, noted, "Sex Pistol John Lydon quaveringly wails "burn, Hollywood, burn" (among other lyrics) through an actual quite Frankie Goes To Hollywood-like surging chugger".

Music video
A black-and-white music video was produced to promote the single, directed by British director Lindy Heymann.

Track listings

 UK and Australian CD and cassette single
 "Open Up" (radio edit)
 "Open Up" (full vocal mix)
 "Open Up" (Dervish Overdrive)

 UK and German 12-inch single
A. "Open Up" (full vocal mix) – 8:46
B. "Open Up" (Dervish Overdrive) – 6:47

 UK remix 12-inch single
A1. "Open Up" (I Hate Pink Floyd mix)
A2. "Open Up" (open dub)
B1. "Open Up" (The Dust Brothers remix)

 Swedish CD single
 "Open Up" (radio edit)
 "Open Up" (full vocal mix)

Charts

References

1993 singles
1993 songs
Alternative dance songs
Black-and-white music videos
Leftfield songs
Music videos directed by Lindy Heymann
Music Week number-one dance singles